Kašėtų gyvenvietės is an archaeological site in Varėna district municipality, in Alytus County, in southeastern Lithuania.

References

Archaeological sites in Lithuania
Villages in Alytus County
Varėna District Municipality